Higher Learning is a 1995 drama film.

Higher Learning may also refer to:

Media
Higher Learning (soundtrack), the soundtrack to the 1995 film
"Higher Learning," a song on Sam Roberts's 2003 album We Were Born in a Flame
"Higher Learning", a song on Patti Smith's compilation album Land (1975–2002)

Education
Higher learning, a synonym for higher education